James Christopher Dunne (born 1 December 1947, in Dublin) is an Irish former professional footballer. He played as a central defender or midfielder.

He went from Shelbourne to Millwall in 1966 but didn't play first team for Millwall, before moving to Torquay United in 1967. After scoring 13 goals in 126 appearances for United, he then moved to Fulham in 1970. At Fulham he was a regular for four seasons and won his only international cap for the Republic of Ireland in 1971 against Austria.

He finished his career by returning to play with Torquay United from 1975 until 1979.

The highlight of his management career was taking the Morwell Falcons to being Victorian State League champions in 1984.

Jimmy currently resides in Perth, Western Australia.

External links
Republic of Ireland profile

Sources
The Boys In Green - The FAI International Story (1997): Sean Ryan

1947 births
Fulham F.C. players
League of Ireland managers
Shelbourne F.C. players
League of Ireland players
Millwall F.C. players
Torquay United F.C. players
Association footballers from Dublin (city)
Republic of Ireland international footballers
Republic of Ireland association footballers
Living people
Association football forwards
Association football midfielders
Republic of Ireland football managers